Lăpușnic may refer to several places in Romania:

Lăpușnic, a village in Dobra Commune, Hunedoara County
Lăpușnic, a village in Bara Commune, Timiș County
Lăpușnic, an alternative name for the upper course of the Râul Mare (Mureș basin) in Hunedoara County
Lăpușnic (Nera), a tributary of the Nera in Caraș-Severin County

See also 
 Lăpuș (disambiguation)